Rodulfo Amando Philippi Bañados (25 May 1905 - 31 July 1969) was a Chilean ornithologist. The great-grandson of German naturalist Rodolfo Amando Philippi (1808-1904), he worked at the Museo Nacional de Historia Natural de Chile as a curator of birds and wrote extensively on Chilean ornithology. By profession he was a pediatrician. 

Philippi was born in Santiago, Chile to physician Otto Philippi and trained in medicine like his father and became a paediatrician. He however took a keen interest in ornithology and was a curator of birds at the Museo Nacional de Historia Natural in Santiago from 1938 to 1966 and published some of the major works on the birds of the region.

References 

1905 births
1969 deaths
Chilean ornithologists
Rodulfo Amando